Enid Lake is a lake that is located mostly in Yalobusha County in the U.S. state of Mississippi. Parts of it extend into Panola and Lafayette counties. Common fish species include crappie, largemouth bass, catfish and bream.

Enid Dam is an earthen dam across the Yocona River. The structure was completed in 1952, for flood control and recreation, as a project of the United States Army Corps of Engineers.

See also
George P. Cossar State Park
Tailrace fishing

Notes

References

External links

US Army Corps Of Engineers: Enid Lake Welcome
North Mississippi Fish Hatchery

Protected areas of Lafayette County, Mississippi
Protected areas of Panola County, Mississippi
Protected areas of Yalobusha County, Mississippi
Reservoirs in Mississippi
Bodies of water of Lafayette County, Mississippi
Bodies of water of Panola County, Mississippi
Bodies of water of Yalobusha County, Mississippi